Hilarographa khaoyai is a species of moth of the family Tortricidae. It is found in Thailand.

The wingspan is about 8 mm. The ground colour of the forewings is greyish suffused and diffusely strigulated (finely streaked) grey-brown. The hindwings are brownish.

Etymology
The name refers to the type locality.

References

Moths described in 2009
Hilarographini